Jeannot Castonguay (born 1 September 1944) was a Liberal member of the House of Commons of Canada from 2000 to 2004. He won the Madawaska—Restigouche electoral district in New Brunswick to become a member of the 37th Canadian Parliament. Born in Saint-Quentin, New Brunswick, Castonguay, is a career physician.

Castonguay left political life in 2004 as he did not seek re-election. Jean-Claude D'Amours won the Madawaska-Restigouche riding for the Liberal party that year.

References

1944 births
Living people
Physicians from New Brunswick
Liberal Party of Canada MPs
Members of the House of Commons of Canada from New Brunswick
21st-century Canadian politicians